The Martists were a political faction within the Liberal Party, led by Cristino Martos, which split from the party in 1890 and ran on its own in the 1891 general election. The faction disbanded after Martos' death in January 1893.

References

Liberal Party (Spain, 1880)
Defunct political parties in Spain
Political parties established in 1890
Political parties disestablished in 1893
1890 establishments in Spain
1893 disestablishments in Spain
Restoration (Spain)